The first 187 chapters of the Bleach manga series, written and illustrated by Tite Kubo, comprise two story arcs: the  and the . The plot follows the adventures of Ichigo Kurosaki, a teenager who accidentally steals the powers of the Soul Reaper Rukia Kuchiki and subsequently assumes her duties while she convalesces. Since that event, Ichigo has to fight Hollows, evil spirits that attack people. After various works, Rukia is sentenced to death by her Soul Reapers' superiors for her actions, leading Ichigo to invade the afterlife realm called Soul Society to rescue her.

Bleach was published in individual chapters by Shueisha in Weekly Shōnen Jump magazine and was later collected in tankōbon (book) format. The first arc, going through volumes 1–8, was serialized between the August 20, 2001, and February 3, 2003, issues. The second arc, covering volumes 9–21, was released from February 10, 2003, to August 1, 2005. The first seven chapters were released in a tankōbon volume on January 5, 2002, while chapters 179–187 were collected into the 21st volume published on March 3, 2006. These 21 volumes were later compiled into six omnibus collections under the name Resurrected Souls to celebrate the tenth anniversary of the series. The first collection was released on August 22, 2011, and the last was published on January 23, 2012.

An anime adaptation, produced by Studio Pierrot and TV Tokyo, premiered on TV Tokyo on October 5, 2004. These arcs were adapted into the first 63 episodes; the first twenty-episode season 1 acts as a prelude to the second and third seasons in which Ichigo enters the Soul Society. Episode 63 aired on October 1, 2006.

North American licensor Viz Media serialized the individual chapters in Shonen Jump starting from November 2007 in the United States. Viz Media released the first volume on July 6, 2004, while volume 21 was released on October 2, 2007. The company released a hardcover "collector's edition" of the first volume with a dust jacket on August 5, 2008, followed by a box set on September 2, 2008, containing the first 21 volumes, a poster, and a booklet about the series. A re-release of the series under the label of "3-in-1 Edition" started on June 7, 2011; the book containing volumes 19–21 was released on January 7, 2014.

Volume list

Notes

References

External links
Official Bleach website 
Official Shonen Jump Bleach website

Bleach chapters (1-187)